The Roman Catholic Diocese of Patti is located on the north shore of the island of Sicily. It is a suffragan of the Archdiocese of Messina-Lipari-Santa Lucia del Mela.
Its patron saint is Bartholomew the Apostle, in whose honor the cathedral is named.

History 
The diocese of Patti had an ancient precursor, the diocese of Tyndaris. Four of its bishops are known by name: 
 Severinus (501)
 Eutychius (593) 
 Benenatus (599)
 Theodorus (649).

There was also a predecessor in the form of a Diocese of Lipari, which appears to have become extinct, perhaps due to Saracen raids in the 9th century. The bishops known by name are:
Augustus (501, 502)
Venantius (553)
Agatho (593)
[Paulinus] (under Pope Gregory I)

The importance of Patti grew, however, when Duke Robert Guiscard and Count Roger I founded on the island of Lipari Patti a Benedictine abbey, dedicated to Saint Bartholomew, in c. 1085; the abbey was joined to the Abbey of S. Salvatore when it was founded in 1094. On 14 September 1131 Anacletus II, the pope from the double election of 1130 who was recognized in the Kingdom of Sicily, made the monastery of S. Bartholomew in Patti an episcopal see, and at the same time made the Abbey of Lipari an episcopal seat, uniting them in the person of one bishop, who would be consecrated by the Archbishop of Messana. The new See was endowed by King Roger II of Sicily, making it richer than the long established See of Syracuse. Pope Eugenius III in 1157 confirmed the action of Anacletus II.

In 1206, it lost territory to establish the territorial prelature of Santa Lucia del Mela.

Frederick III of Sicily (1295–1337) devastated Patti because the town was a supporter of his Angevin rivals, Robert and Philip of Naples. The French Pope John XXII, who supported the Angevins, laid all of Sicily under an interdict, which lasted from 1321 to 1335, causing severe problems between the Sicilian episcopate and the monarchy.

On 18 April 1399, Lipari and Patti were separated, and the first bishop of the separate see of Patti was Francesco Hermemir. His predecessor, Francesco Gaptulus, continued as Bishop of Lipari.

The Cathedral of S. Bartolommeo in Patti had a chapter consisting of five dignities and nine canons.

In 1827 the bishopric gained territory from the Metropolitan Archdiocese of Messina. On 20 May 1844 the diocese exchanged territory with the bishopric of Cefalù.

The diocese had in the early 20th century 49 parishes, 20,000 inhabitants, 5 religious houses of men, and 15 of sisters, conducting 4 institutes for girls and several schools.

Pope John Paul II visited the diocese in June 1988.

Bishops

Diocese of Patti
Erected: 12th century

...
Gilibertus (1157–1166)
Stephanus (1180–1199)
Anselmus (c. 1208 – 1227?)
Jacobus ( – 25 September 1225)
Paganus (10 October 1229 – 3 March 1246)
Philippus (attested in 1250)
Bartholomaeus de Lentino, O.P. (5 January 1254 – 1282)
Pandulfus (25 February 1286 – 4 July 1290)
Joannes, O.P. (1304 – 1342)
Vincentius, O.Min. (27 November 1342 – 1346)
Petrus de Teutonico, O.Min. (15 February 1346 – 21 January 1354)
Petrus de Thomas, O.Carm. (1354 – 10 May 1359)
Joannes Graphei, O.Min. (17 July 1360 – 1373)
Ubertinus de Coriliono, O.Min. (28 November 1373 – 1386)
Franciscus, O.P. (30 May 1386 – 18 March 1388)
Ubertinus de Coriliono, O.Min. (restored, 16 May 1390 – 18 August 1397)
Franciscus Gaptulus (18 December 1397 – 18 April 1399)
Franciscus Hermemir (12 May 1399 – 1400/1401)
Paulus de Prato (18 July 1401 – 26 June 1402)
Philippus de Ferrerio, O.Carm. (8 July 1402 – 4 July 1414)
...
Giovanni Notarbartolo, (3 Oct 1435 – 1437 Died)
Giacomo di Santa Lucia, O.F.M. (7 Jul 1480 – 1482 Died)
Giacomo Antonio Leofanti (9 Feb 1486 – 1494 Died)
Giovanni Marquet, O.P. (16 Jun 1494 – 1499 Died)

from 1500 to 1800

Miguel Figueroa (bishop) (4 Sep 1500 – 10 May 1517 Died)
Francisco de Urríes (Verreis) (21 Jun 1518 – 8 Jun 1534)
Arnau Alberti (Arnaldo Albertini) (12 Sep 1534 – 7 Oct 1544 Died)
Girolamo Sigismondi (14 Dec 1545 – 1548 Died)
Bartolomé Sebastián de Aroitia (9 Jan 1549 – 1 Oct 1567
Antonio Rodríguez de Pazos y Figueroa (17 Sep 1568 – 29 Oct 1578 Resigned)
Gilberto Isfar y Corillas (23 Jan 1579 – 15 Apr 1600 Died)
Bonaventura Secusio, O.F.M. Obs. (30 Apr 1601 – 17 Aug 1605)
Juan de Rada, O.F.M. (16 Jan 1606 – Jan 1609 Died)
Vincenzo Napoli (2 Dec 1609 – 23 Aug 1648 Died)
Ludovico Ridolfi (19 Jul 1649 – 28 Oct 1649 Died)
Luc Cochiglia (27 Feb 1651 – 1653 Died)
Luis Alfonso de Los Cameros (12 Jan 1654 – 16 Oct 1656)
Simone Rau e Requesens (8 Jul 1658 – 20 Sep 1659 Died)
Ignazio d'Amico (31 Jul 1662 – 15 Dec 1666 Appointed, Bishop of Agrigento)
Giovanni Antonio Geloso (17 Jun 1669 – 3 Nov 1669)
Vincenzo Maffia, O.P. (20 Apr 1671 – 16 Nov 1674 Died)
Antonio Bighetti (28 Mar 1678 – May 1678 Died)
Francesco Martinelli (bishop), C.O. (22 Jan 1680 – 3 Apr 1681 Died)
Matteo Fazio, O.P. (26 Jan 1682 – 6 Sep 1692 Died)
Giuseppe Migliaccio (18 May 1693 – 24 Nov 1698 Appointed, Archbishop of Messina)
Francesco Girgenti, C.O. (11 Apr 1699 – 25 Sep 1701 Died)
Ettore Algaria (17 Dec 1703 – 24 Jul 1713 Died)
Pietro Galletti (30 Aug 1723 – 28 Nov 1729 Appointed, Bishop of Catania)
Giacomo Bonanno, C.R. (5 May 1734 – 28 May 1753) 
Giovanni Girolamo Gravina, C.R. (10 Dec 1753 – 17 Apr 1755 Died)
Carlo Mineo (16 Feb 1756 – 7 Sep 1771 Died)
Salvatore Pisani (14 Dec 1772 – 14 May 1781 Died)
Raimondo Moncada, C.R. (25 Feb 1782 – 18 Sep 1813 Died)

Since 1800

Silvestro Todaro, O.F.M. Conv. (22 Jul 1816 – 21 Apr 1821)
Nicolò Gatto (17 Nov 1823 – 31 Dec 1831 Died)
Giuseppe Saitta (30 Sep 1833 – 20 Jun 1838 Died)
Martino Ursino (Orsino) (25 Jul 1844 – 8 Feb 1860 Died)
Michelangelo Celesia, O.S.B. (23 Mar 1860 – 27 Oct 1871)
Ignazio Carlo Vittore Papardo del Parco, C.R. (27 Oct 1871 – 22 Nov 1874 Died)
Giuseppe Maria Maragioglio, O.F.M. Cap. (15 Mar 1875 – 20 Jan 1888 Died)
Giovanni Previtera (Privitera) (1 Jun 1888 – 14 Feb 1903 Died)
Francesco Maria Traina (22 Jun 1903 – 18 Nov 1911 Died)
Ferdinando Fiandaca (10 Apr 1912 – 1 Aug 1930 Resigned)
Antonio Mantiero (26 Sep 1931 – 24 Aug 1936 Appointed, Bishop of Treviso)
Angelo Ficarra (12 Oct 1936 – 2 Aug 1957 Resigned)
Giuseppe Pullano (2 Aug 1957 – 30 Nov 1977 Died)
Carmelo Ferraro (30 Mar 1978 – 3 Nov 1988 Appointed, Bishop of Agrigento)
Ignazio Zambito (12 May 1989 – 1 February 2017)
Giglielmo Giombanco (1 February 2017 – )

References

Sources

Reference works
 (in Latin)
 (in Latin)

 pp. 946–947. (Use with caution; obsolete)
 (in Latin)
Kamp, Norbert (1975). Kirche und Monarchie im staufischen Königreich Sizilien: I. Prosopographische Grundlegung, Bistumer und Bischofe des Konigreichs 1194–1266: 3. Sizilien München: Wilhelm Fink 1975, pp. 1078-1108.
 (in Latin)
 (in Latin)

Studies

Rodriquez, Carlo "Breve cenno storico sulla Chiesa Liparese,"

External links
Gabriel Chow, GCatholic.org, - GCatholic, listing the bishops

Acknowledgment

Patti
Patti